The USWA World Tag Team Championship was the primary professional wrestling tag team championship promoted by the Memphis, Tennessee-based United States Wrestling Association (USWA). The Continental Wrestling Association and World Class Wrestling Association (WCWA) merged in 1989 to form the USWA. In the merger the USWA replaced both the WCWA World Tag Team Championship and the CWA Tag Team Championship with the USWA version. The promotion awarded Cactus Jack and Scott Braddock the championship after they won the WCWA championship on August 4, 1989. The USWA closed in 1997, with PG-13 (J. C. Ice and Wolfie D) as the final champions. There were a total of 116 reigns in the eight year lifetime of the championship.

The final champions, PG-13, holds the record for most championship reigns as they held the belts on 15 different occasions across the years, in addition each member also held the championship with a different partner, making them tied for most overall reigns for an individual. The Moondogs (Spot and Spike) reign as champions lasted between 123 and 152 days, the longest of any championship team. In April 1992 Moondog Cujo replaced Spike, but records are unclear as to what date the change was made. The teams of Jim and Ron Harris, Tommy Rich and Doug Gilbert, and Flash Flanagan and Nick Dinsmore, all lost the championship on the same show that they won the championship, tying them for the shortest reign.

As it is a professional wrestling championship, the championship was won not by actual competition, but by kayfabe to a match determined by the bookers and match makers. On occasion the promotion declares a championship vacant, which means there is no champion at that point in time. This can either be due to a storyline, or real life issues such as a champion suffering an injury being unable to defend the championship, or leaving the company.

Title history

Team reigns by combined length

Individual reigns by combined length

USWA Tag Team Championship Tournament (1989)
The USWA Tag Team Tournament was a one-night single elimination tag team tournament held in Dallas, Texas on December 1, 1989, for the vacant USWA World Tag Team Championship.

Footnotes

References

United States Wrestling Association championships
Tag team wrestling championships